Arvid Arisholm (18 September 1888 – 2 February 1963) was a Norwegian footballer. He played in one match for the Norway national football team in 1908.

References

External links
 
 

1888 births
1963 deaths
Norwegian footballers
Norway international footballers
Association football midfielders